Athens Female College was the name of two separate American women's colleges, both now coed and since renamed:

 1857–1866 in Athens, Tennessee: now Tennessee Wesleyan College
 1889–1931 in Athens, Alabama: now Athens State University

See also
 Athens College (disambiguation)